Dark Universe is a 1993 horror/science-fiction film starring Blake Pickett, Cherie Scott, Bently Title, John Maynard, Paul Austin Saunders, Patrick Moran, Tom Ferguson, Steve Barkett, and Joe Estevez as Rod Kendrick. The soundtrack was composed by Jeffrey Walton. The film was written by Moran, executive-produced by Fred Olen Ray, Grant Austin Waldman, and Jim Wynorski, and directed by Steve Latshaw.

Plot

While on board the space ship Nautilus, an astronaut turns into an Alien-like monster after being infected by alien spores. When the ship crash lands in Florida, the monster goes on a killing rampage.

Production
According to Stephen Latshaw the film was shot in ten days for $40,000 and was "a huge hit for Curb Entertainment... it took in over $400,000 in world wide sales."

Reception

Creature Feature gave the movie one star, calling in boring and inept.

Home Release

The movie is available to stream on several sites, including YouTube as of January 2022.

Video box description
"From the darkest corner of the universe comes an alien terror with a cold-blooded mission...conquer the Earth and harvest its inhabitants as a food source. Can our world survive this nightmare from deep space?"

References

External links

Video Graveyard review
eFilmCritic.com review
DVD Authority review

1993 horror films
1990s science fiction horror films
1993 films
American science fiction horror films
1990s English-language films
1990s American films